María Izquierdo  (October 30, 1902 – December 2, 1955) was a Mexican painter. She is known for being the first Mexican woman to have her artwork exhibited in the United States. She committed both her life and her career to painting art that displayed her Mexican roots and held her own among famous (important figure in mexicanismo) Mexican male artists: Diego Rivera, José Clemente Orozco, and David Alfaro Siqueiros.

Early life
María Cenobia Izquierdo Gutiérrez was born in San Juan de los Lagos, Jalisco, Mexico. At age five, she and her mother moved to Torreón after the death of her father. Her mother later married Dr. Nicanor Valdes Rodríguez, at which point Izquierdo was raised by her grandparents and relatives in small towns in Northern Mexico. Both her grandmother and aunt were devout Catholics, and much of her upbringing revolved around daily Catholic traditions.

Always interested in art, Izquierdo spent much of her time alone, teaching herself new art techniques. In 1923, she and her family moved to Mexico City, where she was able to go to school to study art and develop into a professional artist.

Training
Izquierdo began studying in January 1928 at the Escuela Nacional de Bellas Artes (Academy of Fine Arts). Her move to Mexico City in the 1920s evoked her to explore her growing passion for art and came about the same time a paradigm shift occurred in Mexico. At the same time, the Mexican Revolution came to an end, bringing along a change of values in Mexico. Through President Álvaro Obregón, many new reform policies were emphasized, pushing for more social and educational institutions that upheld traditional Mexican beliefs and culture. These ideals resonated with Izquierdo, drawing her to attend the art academy.

Prior to Obregón's reforms, European art served as the model in art institutions. His new reforms drew in many of Mexico's most talented artists, commissioning their creation of murals addressing the importance of traditional Mexican values, which were painted on both schools and government buildings. While attending the Academy of Fine Arts, Izquierdo was instructed by Rufino Tamayo, Manuel Rodríguez Lozano and German Gedovius. She was also highly influenced by Diego Rivera, who served the director of Academy of Fine Arts in 1929 and later became pivotal in helping launch Izquierdo's career.

Recognized as one of Rivera's favorite students, the praise she received by Rivera lead to her undergoing frequent hostility from her peers. In February 1931, Izquierdo left the Academy of Fine Arts because of the animosity she received from her classmates and her frustration with the school's growing concentration on art serving only as a catalyst for political change. In the early 1920s a circle of young writers and artists, Including Maria Izquierdo, published a magazine called the Contemporáneos. The group would later adopt this name to identify themselves. Izquierdo, along with Manuel Rodríguez Lozano, Rufino Tamayo, and Julio Castellanos, all had been associated with the Movimiento Pro-Arte Mexicano, founded by Adolfo Best Maugard. Beyond the status of colleagues and friends, the Contemporáneos were collaborators. For the Contemporáneos, the city was a hub of Mexico's evolving modernity. While celebrating Mexico's unique traditions, the Contemporáneos embraced this idea of universal cosmopolitanism, and believed that Mexican culture should remain open to international influences and to the voice of the urban intellectual.

An instructor who continued to serve as a mentor even after she left the Academy of Fine Arts was Rufino Tamayo. He was said to be her lover.

Sharing a studio with the young artist for four years, Tamayo had a profound impact on Izquierdo's early development as an artist.  Introducing her to watercolor, the two shared similar subject matter and color palettes.  Both believed art should serve more as a poetic outlet than a political one, and while their professional relationship grew, so did a romantic one.  Throughout their relationship, Izquierdo remained independent. Becoming an active part of the Liga de Escritres y Artistas Revoluctionaros (LEAR; League of Revolutionary Writers and Artists) in 1934, Izquierdo went on to use the artistic techniques that Tamayo helped her develop to create her own artistic style.

Initial career and exhibitions
In the early 1920s, Izquierdo began associating herself with the Movimiento Pro-Arte Mexicano and the Contemporáneos. One of her colleagues and close friend, Lola Álvarez Bravo remembers her as "a very cheerful woman with a folk spirit... like a jar full of pure fresh water... The inclination that Maria had for folklore was not that of a distant viewer, she seemed rather to be an insider, like one more folk element."

Within just her first year at the Academy of Fine Arts, Izquierdo participated in four art exhibitions. The first art exhibit opened on November 19, 1928, and was organized by the Academy's student union, showcasing three of her paintings: "Marina" (Seacape), "El juicio de Toral" (The Trial of Toral) and "Cámara con gallo" (Camera with Rooster). The exhibition was well attended by those who held prestigious roles at the Academy. Gaining praise from art academy leaders like Assistant Secretary of Education, Moisés Sáenz, the crowd was immediately impressed by her talent. Gaining prominence within the art world, Izquierdo's name continued to spread in the years that followed. Diego Rivera described her at her first individual exhibition as "one of the most appealing figures in the art scene in Mexico". He often described her as "one of the best at the academy" and many publications reviewed the 1929 solo exhibition highlighting Rivera exclamation that Izquierdo "was the only real artist with merit" at the Academy).

Izquierdo's art gained international recognition in 1930 when she became the first Mexican woman to have a solo exhibition in the United States. An exhibition funded and organized by Frances Flynn Paine, Izquierdo's works were displayed at the Art Center in New York .  While Izquierdo's art was being exhibited in New York, two of her other paintings were a part of Rene d'Harnoncourt's traveling exhibition. Both the paintings that made up her solo exhibition and were included in René d' Harnoncourt's traveling exhibition, went on to become a part of an extensive exhibition at the Art Center on 56th street for 5 years. Her art was exhibited in New York's Museum of Modern Art in 1940 and that same year was also exhibited in Paris.

Quickly becoming an internationally known artist, Izquierdo hit the peak of her career in the early 1940s. In May 1944 she began serving as the cultural ambassador for Mexico and traveled to several South American countries until late September. Her career, however, hit both a financial and artistic rough patch in the mid-1940s when she had her first stroke. That same year, she lost her commission to paint a cycle of murals in the Palacio del Departamento del Distrito Federal (The District Federal Department) to "Los Tres Grandes". Mexican muralists Diego Rivera, Jose Orozco, and David Siquerios all proclaimed she lacked both talent and experience to complete such a large project. Diego Rivera, the man who once served as her number one supporter, then hindered her career.  Izquierdo is well known for rebutting the Mexican muralist actions with her famous quote: "it is a crime to be born a woman and have talent".

An exhibition that traveled to Frankfurt, Vienna, and Dallas in 1987–88 showed a group of striking paintings by Izquierdo that announced to a non-Mexican audience the powerful presence of another painter of almost equal stature and originality. The career of this outstanding artist was the subject of a recent ground-breaking exhibition organised by the Centro Cultural/Arte Contemporaneo in Mexico City. Izquierdo's work shares many of the same themes and pre-occupations as that of Kahlo. Her paintings often refer to tragic elements in her life and incorporate the type of dream-like fantasies that are to be found in the work of artists of the Mexican School. The exhibition included 160 works. The excellent catalog presented five biographical and interpretive essays, with a complete bibliography, chronology and exhibition history. The vast corpus of photographs of both the artist and her work gives a visual repertory of virtually every known painting, drawing and print. It is an essential addition to the bibliography of modern Mexican painting.

Style
Classified by some as a surrealist painter, María Izquierdo never identified herself as a surrealist. Instead, Izquierdo identified with the Contemporáneos, who believed that Mexican culture should be rightfully seen as a vital contributor to the dominant Western culture. She wasn't afraid to go against popular Mexican art movements and follow her own style of painting. Her culture as a mestiza was an essential part of her artistic style and themes used in her work. Izquierdo was celebrated as an artist with a genuine understanding of native and rural traditions, and her altar paintings were recognized at the time for "their delightful indigenous ingenuousness." Her naive painterly technique, intended to recall the folk painting of regional artisans, heightened the effect. Still, many of her paintings contain unusual subject matters and interesting juxtapositions. Izquierdo's peculiar inclusion into a Mexican nationalist discourse suggest ways of bringing together several sets of discourses too often kept separate: those of Latin America, of feminism, of modernism, and of nationalism. Still, many of her paintings contain unusual subject matters and interesting juxtapositions. Known for her use of bold, rich, and bright colors, most of Izquierdo's paintings were done using oil paints or watercolor. Although she was and is still often compared to Frida Kahlo because both woman launched their careers at similar times, the two have very individual styles. At the beginning she would paint still life and portraits. She experimented with many different styles and techniques; such as, oil painting, watercolor, still life, and landscape.

During her time as Diego Rivera's star pupil, he described her artwork as "proud yet modest". Izquierdo's portraits are mature studies in interpretation, they are stylistically very feminine and unmistakably Mexican. In 1937, reviews of her work began to use words like "primitive" and to define her work as primitivist, these comments gained certain regional isolationism. Izquierdo painted a significant number of works with religious themes that fall into a category of imagery, about folk Catholicism or popular art or both. Some representations of popular devotion could be interpreted as religious subjects or as homages to the popular and artisan traditions of Mexico, especially rural Mexico. This category, which is often ambiguous in its intent, is exemplified by María Izquierdo's Calvario (Calvary) of 1933. Izquierdo painted most of her images from memory. Her friend the poet Margarita Michelena recalled that they often went to the country together, and Izquierdo dedicated herself to just looking. Izquierdo evoked memory in her paintings in two ways. First, she used formal means to create a sense of time past. Prior to 1940 she employed loose brushstrokes and avoided detail. Throughout her life she created paintings that lack the directional light and cast shadows that would suggest a specific time of day. Second, after 1940 she portrayed traditional aspects of Mexican culture that were known to be vanishing, such as coscomates (granaries) and altars to the Virgin of Sorrows. The tradition of making Viernes de Dolores altars began to vanish in the 1940s. This is precisely the decade in which Izquierdo painted her series of Viernes de Dolores altars.

Subject matter
Early on, Izquierdo established herself as a painter of still lifes, altars, circus scenes, and portraits of women. Making it a point to tie her art with Mexican popular tradition, Izquierdo pushed back from what many of her peers at the Academy of Fine Arts were doing. Instead of painting political messages, she painted images that held personal meaning and was rooted in Mexican traditions. Images of Día de los Muertos (Day of the Dead), the Mexican country side, and Catholic saints were common in her paintings. She saw art as communication to the soul and her frequent images of the circus traced back to her memories visiting the circus with her aunt and grandmother in San Juan de los Lagos, Jalisco.  Her self-portraits often depicted her in traditional Mexican garments, for example Autorretrato (Self Portrait) made in 1940.

She often "paints a complex picture of social roles of the modern Mexican Women", specifically the role women play in perpetuating Mexican traditions. Rather, Izquierdo identified with the ideals and aesthetics of the Contemporáneos, they were dedicated to an apolitical Mexicanness or A lo Mexicano and were very critical of the Nationalism Muralists. Growing up, Maria lived with her grandmother and an aunt, as was customary at the time, the women raised Maria around the disciplines of the Catholic Church. Maria's up bringing is characterized by strict adherence to catholic traditions and customs. This is highly represented in her tradition focused narratives which demonstrate scenes like votive shrines. 

Izquierdo's canvases have a provincial simplicity, inspired by folk devotional art and French painters such as Henri Matisse and Manet. In particular, they exhibit a "masterly use of colour" and frequently include cupboards, altars, fruit, horses, portraits, and the circus.

View on feminism

In 1945 Izquierdo became the first woman to be granted a major governmental mural commission, in the central stairwell of the Department of the Federal District government building. In the initial stages of its execution, however, Mexico City's governor revoked the commission due to the interference of Rivera and David Alfaro Siqueiros, who claimed that Izquierdo lacked the necessary experience for such a high-profile project. Izquierdo received an enormous amount of critical backlash in the press for speaking out against the idea that woman are treated and disrespected as something else in the work force, but she never backed down from her insistence that she deserved the commission from the mural. Izquierdo debated diligently against the way men have been treating woman as a lower half of the spectrum as woman never gain the true acknowledgment in the work force and more critical in art. Izquierdo had a large debate and talk with a large amount of woman to make people understand woman need more respect and get better grasp of their skills in what they love to do. She says in a article debate "Añadiría una precisión: incluiría entre los intangibles a la subjetividad. Porque todo eso de lo que estamos hablando y la dirección que toma depende de la subjetividad: emociones y procesos cognitivos" (I would add a precision: include between the intangibles to the subjectivity. Because that is what we are all talking about and the direction that we take depends on the subjectivity: emotions and process cognitive).

Even though she was a female Mexican artist who painted near the same time as feminist Latin American painters, Remedios Varo and Leonora Carrington, Izquierdo did not identify herself as a feminist.  A believer that women should have the chance to explore different professional realms, she also held strong to the traditional family roles instilled in her by her aunt and grandmother. Izquierdo criticized feminism and "pseudo-intellectual" women stating that "they think that bragging outloud makes them better [than men]; but deep inside they are still full of old prejudices and are just covering up with theatrical attitudes for their inferiority complex. I think feminists have not conquered anything for humanity, nor for themselves, and instead of helping women grow (who for so many years have been slaves of everything) they get in the way of emancipation." While her painting, The Jewelry Box, sends a satirical message surrounding the roles of woman roles and her work, Alegoría del trabajo (Allegory of Work) does provoke the idea of female oppression. Her 1940 painting, Mis Sobrinas (My Nieces), shows how much she valued family ties and the female obligation to the family. 

She often depicted females in a variety of social settings and backgrounds, but only painted herself with her family or alone. She was part of the Contemporáneos, they offered alternative depictions of masculinity as well as offered a different representation of women in modern Mexico. A new "chica moderna" or "modern girl" was developing in Mexico. Izquierdo embraced this new image, often seen in the characteristically dressed in modern clothes, lit cigarette in mouth. In association with the Contemporáneos, the group critiqued the specific ideology of masculinity, the warrior hero had been used to define national identity by the Muralists. The Contemporáneos defined alternative concepts of national identity, resisted the notion of the warrior hero and promoted more comprehensive representations of women. The first time Izquierdo was cited on women's rights was in 1935 during a trip to Guadalajara for the opening of an exhibition of posters by women artists. In response to a question posed by a leftist journalist about the role of women in the revolutionary struggle, she replied: "Above all women must unite and fight together strongly to improve their condition. Women have to cease being luxury objects and transform themselves into a factor within the class struggle; they ought to evolve socially and participate directly in the revolutionary struggle." This is the only time that Izquierdo argued for group action. Izquierdo's paintings, give us a deconstruction of 'heroic' Mexican nationalism using the marginalized identity of the female on two distinct levels: (1) the more conventional one of protesting social discrimination against women, and more intriguingly (2) as a hinge point for a variety of pictorial explorations.

Later works

Izquierdo painted at least twelve ofrendas between 1940 and 1948. Some of the paintings are populated with toys, sweets, and crafts related to popular Mexican heritage and Catholic occasions. Viernes de Dolores, like her other paintings in this series, faithfully captures the customary contents of Mexican Catholic home altars. The altar is erected on ascending tiers, and the shelves are lined with papel picado, a traditional Mexican craft of hand-cut, brightly colored paper. Local pottery, wares, fruits, and flowers signify the products of the land and the people of Mexico, as they do throughout Mexican post-colonial and modern art. One of Izquierdo's earliest explorations of the cabinet motif came in her Alacena of 1942.

"Trigo crecido" (Growing Wheat), from 1940, presents objects and symbols with distinct local and traditional significance through a transnational modernist vocabulary. Usually grouped with Izquierdo's series of domestic interior tableaux, Trigo crecido was the first home altar that she painted. A late domestic cabinet composition from 1952, La alacena (Viernes de jugueteria ), comes full circle back to Izquierdo's home altars of the previous decade. By titling the work Viernes de jugueteria (Toy Store Friday), Izquierdo playfully connected the painting to the Viernes de Dolores altar series. The composition includes elements typically found in her altars, such as the drawn lace curtains, extinguished candles, toy figurines, and papel picado. Naturaleza viva con huachinango, painted in 1946 by Maria Izquierdo, countered the Muralists' view of Mexican identity with a vision deeply opposed to it. In contrast to the Muralists' images of human and class struggle, this landscape contains no overt human presence. Human activity is in manifested in windowless, abandoned buildings and untouched food set out for unknown, unimagined diners - an ironic and absurd display of abundance which only serves to point out the poverty of the surrounding landscape.

One of the last paintings Izquierdo completed was Sueño y premonición (Dream and Premonition) in 1947. Painting herself holding her own severed head by the hair, the tree branches surrounding her also dangle severed heads. Diminishing figures run along the lower half of the painting while tears fall from her severed head. Although the painting can be interpreted as surrealistic, it is often interpreted as evidence to the suffering she endured in her final years of life.

Impact
María Izquierdo's career helped opened the door for many female artists. Her reputation is often compared to that of Marie Laurencin from the School of Paris and although she is not as popularly known as Frida Kahlo, she helped establish a foundation for female artists. Maintaining value in art rooted in traditional Mexican values, Izquierdo's art stood out for its ingenious portrayals of Mexico among an area of highly politicized art.

Personal life and demise
At age fourteen, she had an arranged marriage to a senior army officer, Colonel Cándido Posadas, and bore three children (two boys and a girl) by the time she was 17 years old. It is said that her daughter influenced some of Izquierdo's work, including "Niñas Durmiendo". She divorced around 1928. Izquierdo had a second marriage, also short-lived, with Chilean painter Raul Uribe.

She suffered a stroke in the mid-1940s which had a significant effect on her health, work and dexterity, but she persisted. Although her last years were some of the most painful in her life, she did not stop painting until she was physically unable. In December 1955, she died of a second stroke in Mexico City.

Further reading

References

 

1902 births
1955 deaths
Artists from Jalisco
People from San Juan de los Lagos, Jalisco
Mexican women painters
Modern painters
Academic staff of Escuela Nacional de Pintura, Escultura y Grabado "La Esmeralda"
20th-century Mexican women artists
20th-century Mexican painters